Madeira is a Portuguese island, and is the largest and most populous of the Madeira Archipelago. As of 2011, Madeira had a total population of 262,456.

The volcano formed atop an east–west rift in the oceanic crust along the African Plate, beginning during the Miocene epoch over 5 million years ago, continuing into the Pleistocene until about 700,000 years ago. This was followed by extensive erosion, producing two large amphitheatres open to south in the central part of the island. Volcanic activity later resumed, producing scoria cones and lava flows atop the older eroded shield. The most recent volcanic eruptions were on the west-central part of the island only 6,500 years ago, creating more cinder cones and lava flows.

It has a mountain ridge that extends along the centre of the island, reaching  at its highest point (Pico Ruivo), while much lower (below ) along its eastern extent. The primitive volcanic foci responsible for the central mountainous area, consisted of the peaks: Ruivo, Torres, Arieiro, Cidrão, Cedro, Casado, Grande, Ferreiro. At the end of this eruptive phase, an island circled by reefs was formed, its marine vestiges are evident in a calcareous layer in the area of Lameiros, in São Vicente (which was later explored for calcium oxide production). Sea cliffs, such as Cabo Girão, valleys and ravines extend from this central spine, making the interior generally inaccessible. Daily life is concentrated in the many villages at the mouths of the ravines, through which the heavy rains of autumn and winter usually travel to the sea.

See also
Madeira, the archipelago and Autonomous Region named after Madeira Island

References

Madeira Island
Islands of the Autonomous Region of Madeira
Polygenetic shield volcanoes
Miocene shield volcanoes
Pliocene shield volcanoes
Pleistocene shield volcanoes
Holocene shield volcanoes